Kim Olafsson Gunnlaugsson (born 27 August 1998) is a Luxembourgish footballer who plays as a forward for Munsbach and the Luxembourg women's national team.

Early life
Olafsson was born in Luxembourg to an Icelandic father and a Luxembourgish mother. Kim moved with only 15 years to Frankfurt, Germany to pursue her football career. After two successful years she unfortunately got a knee injury. 2017 first ACL tear, 2018 and 2019 inside meniscus tear(all left Knee). Kim is still working on her comeback.

Club career
Olafsson has played for FFC Frankfurt II 2. Bundesliga in Germany.

International career
Olafsson made her senior debut for Luxembourg on 29 October 2014 as a 79th-minute substitution in a 1–0 friendly home win over Lithuania. She scored her first international goal on 11 December 2014 in a 2–3 friendly away loss to Cyprus. After these two friendly appearances for Luxembourg, she agreed to officially play for Iceland at youth levels. She represented Iceland at the 2015 UEFA Women's Under-17 Championship and two UEFA Women's Under-19 Championship qualifications (2016 and 2017). On 11 April 2021, she resumed her senior international career with Luxembourg, appearing in a 2–1 friendly away win over Liechtenstein.

International goals

References

External links

1998 births
Living people
Luxembourgian women's footballers
Women's association football forwards
1. FFC Frankfurt players
Eintracht Frankfurt (women) players
2. Frauen-Bundesliga players
Luxembourg women's international footballers
Luxembourgian expatriate footballers
Luxembourgian expatriate sportspeople in Germany
Expatriate women's footballers in Germany
Luxembourgian people of Icelandic descent
Kim Olafsson
Kim Olafsson
Kim Olafsson
Kim Olafsson
Kim Olafsson
Kim Olafsson